Bob Stetler was an American soccer goalkeeper who played professionally in the North American Soccer League and the Major Indoor Soccer League.

Youth
Stetler graduated from Stroudsburg High School where he was a Pennsylvania Interscholastic Athletic Association wrestling champion.  He began his college career with Huron College before transferring to East Stroudsburg State University his junior year where he both played soccer and wrestled.  He was a 1974 Third Team and 1975 Second Team Division II All American wrestler.  In 1974, he placed third in the 158 lb. division of the NCAA Division II national championship.

Professional
In 1975, he signed with the Tampa Bay Rowdies of the North American Soccer League. He spent the 1975 season as an amateur, then turned professional in 1976. Settler did not play during the 1975 indoor season, but did appear in two games during the Rowdies' championship 1976 indoor campaign, starting one of them. He saw time in four outdoor games, mostly as late game substitutes to Arnie Mausser. The Rowdies released him just before the 1977 season.  In April 1977, he signed as a free agent with the Washington Diplomats. In the fall of 1977, the Diplomats sent him on loan to the Memphis Rogues for the indoor season, but a hand injury kept him out of any games. The Diplomats then traded him to the Rogues where he played 27 games during the outdoor season. In the fall of 1980, he moved to the Phoenix Inferno of the Major Indoor Soccer League. In 1981, he finished his professional career with the San Jose Earthquakes.

He died in a car accident in July 1990.  At the time he owned the club, Rumours in the Gap.

References

External links
 NASL/MISL stats
 Tampa Bay Rowdies player profile

1990 deaths
American soccer players
Association football goalkeepers
East Stroudsburg Warriors men's soccer players
Major Indoor Soccer League (1978–1992) players
Memphis Rogues players
North American Soccer League (1968–1984) players
North American Soccer League (1968–1984) indoor players
Phoenix Inferno players
San Jose Earthquakes (1974–1988) players
Tampa Bay Rowdies (1975–1993) players
Washington Diplomats (NASL) players
1952 births